International Cricket Council sold its rights of broadcasting for 2011 Cricket World Cup for around US$2 Billion to ESPN Star Sports. It would be broadcasting all around the world in about 220 countries.

For the first time, the Cricket World Cup will be broadcast in High Definition (HD) format. Live matches will also be shown by 3G mobile streaming for the first time.

Each and every match will be covered by 27 cameras including features like movable slips cameras and new low 45-degree field cameras. The broadcast production will also have a mid-wicket camera position for live running between wickets.

In United States, the official broadcaster Willow TV will broadcast the matches on Dish Network and DirecTV on the Willow Cricket HD channel. Using IPTV technology, Willow TV will broadcast matches to users of Roku, Google TV, PlayStation 3, DishworldIPTV, Boxee Box, Samsung Internet@TV, and Netgear Push2TV HD devices. The matches are also available on multiple tablet or mobile devices.

Television

Radio

Internet

References

This information now publish in Yahoo's cricket website: 
This information was earlier published in ICC's website: icc-cricket.yahoo.net
This information was earlier published in Willow.tv's website: Willow.tv

Broadcasting